Tsvyatko Pashkulev (4 February 1945 – 1 November 2019) was a Bulgarian wrestler. He competed in the men's Greco-Roman bantamweight at the 1964 Summer Olympics.

References

1945 births
2019 deaths
Place of birth missing
Bulgarian male sport wrestlers
Olympic wrestlers of Bulgaria
Wrestlers at the 1964 Summer Olympics